Tobias Hess (31 January 1568 – 24 November 1614) was a German lawyer based in Tübingen. He practised as a Paracelsian physician.

Hess was influenced by Simon Studion. He has been identified, alongside Christoph Besold and Johannes Valentinus Andreae, as one of the authors of the Rosicrucian manifestos.

In 1597 he corresponded with Simon Studion and agreed with him that the Papacy must fall in 1604.

References

Further reading
http://www.ritmanlibrary.com/collection/rosicrucians/

1558 births
1614 deaths
17th-century German lawyers
Rosicrucians
People from Tübingen